Strawberry saxifrage is a common name for several plants and may refer to:

Saxifraga stolonifera, broadly distributed in the northern hemisphere
Saxifragopsis fragarioides, native to western North America